Adnethiceras is an extinct genus of Ammonite.

Distribution
Jurassic deposites in Austria and Hungary.

References
Notes

Jurassic ammonites